Tana Senn (born 1971) is an American politician who has represented the 41st legislative district in the Washington House of Representatives since 2013.

Early life and education 
Raised in the Los Angeles suburb of Pacific Palisades, Senn attended the Washington University in St. Louis for her undergraduate education. She went on to attend Columbia University for graduate school. She is a first cousin, once-removed of former Washington state Insurance Commissioner Deborah Senn.

Political career 
Senn was initially selected by the King County Council on September 9, 2013 to replace State Representative Marcie Maxwell and then elected November 2014 with 63% of the vote.

Senn was first appointed to the Mercer Island City Council in January 2012. She was elected to a full 4-year term in November 2013 having run unopposed.

After the resignation of Representative Maxwell, Senn was selected by the Democratic Party Precinct Committee Officers on August 21, 2013 for appointment by the King County Council to the Washington House of Representatives.

References

External links
Washington State Legislature Webpage
Campaign website
Close the gender wage gap

Democratic Party members of the Washington House of Representatives
Living people
Women state legislators in Washington (state)
21st-century American politicians
21st-century American women politicians
1971 births